Anne Born (9 July 1924 – 27 July 2011) was a British poet, local historian, writer and translator.

Biography
Anne Rosemary Cookes was born in south London on 9 July 1924. She joined the First Aid Nursing Yeomanry during the Second World War, and taught Morse code at the SOE at Grendon Underwood, Bucks, where she met Povl Born, a Danish air force pilot. In 1946 they married and moved to Copenhagen, where she studied English literature at the university. She became fluent in Danish, Norwegian, and Swedish.

She began writing poetry and, at the same time, began translating Scandinavian writers into English, such as Hans Christian Andersen, Karen Blixen, Jens Christian Grøndahl, Per Petterson, Michael Larsen, Janne Teller, Stig Holmas, Carsten Jensen, Sissel Lie, Henrik Stangerup, and Knud Hjortø.

In the 1980s, she moved to Salcombe, Devon, where she wrote books on local history. She founded the poetry publisher Overstep Books in 1992, and ran it until 2008.

Recognition
For her translation of Per Petterson's Ut og stjæle hester as Out Stealing Horses, she won the Independent Foreign Fiction Prize and the International Dublin Literary Award.

In 2013, the Poetry Society established a prize, the Anne Born Prize, in her memory. In its first year it was judged by Penelope Shuttle and won by Suzanne Batty.

References

1924 births
2011 deaths
University of Copenhagen alumni
English women poets
English historians
Danish–English translators
Norwegian–English translators
20th-century English poets
20th-century English women writers
20th-century British translators
English women non-fiction writers
British women historians
British expatriates in Denmark